Son Wan-ho (Hangul: 손완호;  or  ; born 17 May 1988) is a South Korean badminton player. He reached a career high as world number 1 in the men's singles in May 2017. He competed at the 2012 and 2016 Summer Olympics. He plays primarily defensively, and began playing badminton after a teacher suggested it to him in elementary school. He holds a bachelor's degree from Inha University in Incheon, South Korea. In 2017, he helped the Korean national team reach the final at the Sudirman Cup and won that tournament. He is married to compatriot women's singles player, Sung Ji-hyun.

Achievements

BWF World Championships 
Men's singles

East Asian Games 
Men's singles

Summer Universiade 
Men's singles

BWF World Tour (3 titles) 
The BWF World Tour, which was announced on 19 March 2017 and implemented in 2018, is a series of elite badminton tournaments sanctioned by the Badminton World Federation (BWF). The BWF World Tours are divided into levels of World Tour Finals, Super 1000, Super 750, Super 500, Super 300 (part of the HSBC World Tour), and the BWF Tour Super 100.

Men's singles

BWF Superseries (2 titles, 5 runners-up) 
The BWF Superseries, which was launched on 14 December 2006 and implemented in 2007, was a series of elite badminton tournaments, sanctioned by the Badminton World Federation (BWF). BWF Superseries levels were Superseries and Superseries Premier. A season of Superseries consisted of twelve tournaments around the world that had been introduced since 2011. Successful players were invited to the Superseries Finals, which were held at the end of each year.

Men's singles

  BWF Superseries Finals tournament
  BWF Superseries Premier tournament
  BWF Superseries tournament

BWF Grand Prix (4 titles, 2 runners-up) 
The BWF Grand Prix had two levels, the Grand Prix and Grand Prix Gold. It was a series of badminton tournaments sanctioned by the Badminton World Federation (BWF) and played between 2007 and 2017.

Men's singles

  BWF Grand Prix Gold tournament
  BWF Grand Prix tournament

BWF International Challenge/Series (1 runner-up) 
Men's singles

  BWF International Challenge tournament
  BWF International Series tournament

Record against selected opponents 
Record against Year-end Finals finalists, World Championships semi-finalists, and Olympic quarter-finalists. Accurate as of 1 December 2022.

References

External links 
 

1988 births
Living people
People from Changwon
Sportspeople from South Gyeongsang Province
South Korean male badminton players
Badminton players at the 2012 Summer Olympics
Badminton players at the 2016 Summer Olympics
Olympic badminton players of South Korea
Badminton players at the 2010 Asian Games
Badminton players at the 2014 Asian Games
Badminton players at the 2018 Asian Games
Asian Games gold medalists for South Korea
Asian Games silver medalists for South Korea
Asian Games medalists in badminton
Medalists at the 2010 Asian Games
Medalists at the 2014 Asian Games
Universiade gold medalists for South Korea
Universiade silver medalists for South Korea
Universiade medalists in badminton
Medalists at the 2015 Summer Universiade
World No. 1 badminton players
21st-century South Korean people